Dos guitarras flamencas en América Latina (Two Flamenco Guitars in Latin America) is the second of four collaboration albums by Paco de Lucía and Ramón de Algeciras.

Track listing

"Cielito lindo" – 2:39
"Alma llanera" – 2:57
"Mañana de carnaval” – 2:45
"El jarabe tapatío" – 2:23
"La flor de la canela" – 2:32
"A pesar de todo" – 2:24
"Siboney" – 2:44
"Granada" – 2:44
"Fina estampa" – 1:45
"Virgen de amor" – 2:23
"Malagueña salerosa" – 2:28
"Tomo y obligo" – 2:09

Musicians
Paco de Lucía – Flamenco guitar
Ramón de Algeciras – Flamenco guitar

References
 Gamboa, Manuel José and Nuñez, Faustino. (2003). Paco de Lucía. Madrid:Universal Music Spain.

1967 albums
Paco de Lucía albums
Universal Music Spain albums
Collaborative albums
Instrumental albums